Coaley Peak is a picnic site and viewpoint in the English county of Gloucestershire.

It is next to a Woodland Trust beech wood and the National Trust's Frocester Hill site. The Cotswold Way long-distance footpath passes through the site. The site includes the excavated Neolithic burial site Nympsfield Long Barrow.

Coaley Peak was for many years a seasonal home to a community of new age travellers, who were evicted around 2002 to make way for more grassland.

References

Parks and open spaces in Gloucestershire
Cotswolds